The 1918–19 season was Galatasaray SK's 15th in existence. The Istanbul Football League was unaccomplished due to the Armistice of Mudros.

Istanbul Football League

Friendly Matches
Kick-off listed in local time (EEST)

References

 Futbol vol.2, Galatasaray. Tercüman Spor Ansiklopedisi.(1981) (page 556-557)
 Atabeyoğlu, Cem. 1453-1991 Türk Spor Tarihi Ansiklopedisi. page(73).(1991) An Grafik Basın Sanayi ve Ticaret AŞ
 1918-1919 İstanbul Futbol Ligi. Türk Futbol Tarihi vol.1. page(42). (June 1992) Türkiye Futbol Federasyonu Yayınları.

External links
 Galatasaray Sports Club Official Website 
 Turkish Football Federation - Galatasaray A.Ş. 
 uefa.com - Galatasaray AŞ

Galatasaray S.K. (football) seasons
Turkish football clubs 1918–19 season
1910s in Istanbul